Robert North Bradbury (March 23, 1886 – November 24, 1949) (born Ronald E. Bradbury) was an American film actor, director, and screenwriter. He directed 125 movies between 1918 and 1941, and is best known for directing early "Poverty Row"-produced Westerns starring John Wayne in the 1930s, and being the father of noted "cowboy actor" and film noir tough guy Bob Steele.

Bradbury variously billed himself as "Robert North Bradbury", "R.N. Bradbury", or "Robert Bradbury". He died in Glendale, California, on November 24, 1949, at age 63.

Work with John Wayne
Bradbury is most famous for directing early Westerns starring John Wayne. These inexpensively shot 1930s "Poverty Row" movies include Riders of Destiny (1933; an early singing-cowboy movie), The Lucky Texan (1934), West of the Divide (1934), Blue Steel (1934), The Man From Utah (1934), The Star Packer (1934), The Trail Beyond (1934; co-starring Noah Beery, Sr. and Noah Beery, Jr.), The Lawless Frontier (1934), Texas Terror (1935), Rainbow Valley (1935), The Dawn Rider (1935), Westward Ho (1935), and Lawless Range (1935). Many were also written by Bradbury, and almost all featured character actor George "Gabby" Hayes.

Filmography

Director 

 The Social Pirates (1916) (*serial)
 The Wooing of Riley (1918)
 The Iron Test (1918)
 Perils of Thunder Mountain (1919)
 The Faith of the Strong (1919)
 The Last of His People (1919)
 The Adventures of Bill and Bob (1920)
 Into the Light (1920)
 The Impostor (1921)
 The Tempest (1921)
 The Sage-Brush Musketeers (1921)
 Catching a Coon (1921)
 The American Badger (1921)
 The Civet Cat (1921)
 Mother o' Dreams (1921)
 Lorraine of the Timberlands (1921)
 The Skunk (1921)
 The Honor of Rameriz (1921)
 The Spirit of the Lake (1921)
 A Day in the Wilds (1921)
 The Heart of Doreon (1921)
 Trailing the Coyote (1921)
 Dangerous Trails (1922)
 Mysterious Tracks (1922)
 The Opossum (1922)
 It Is the Law (1922)
 Seeing Red (1922)
 Daring Dangers (1922)
 Two Men (1922)
 Ridin' Through (1922)
 The Hour of Doom (1922)
 A Guilty Cause (1922)
 At Large (1922)
 Come Clean (1922)
 Riders of the Law (1922)
 The Forbidden Trail (1923)
 Gallopin' Through (1923)
 Wolf Tracks (1923)
 Desert Rider (1923)
 Face to Face (1923)
 The Wolf Trapper (1923)
 What Love Will Do (1923)
 No Tenderfoot (1923)
 The Red Warning (1923)
 The Man from Wyoming (1924)
 The Phantom Horseman (1924)
 Wanted by the Law (1924)
 The Galloping Ace (1924)
 Behind Two Guns (1924)
 Yankee Speed (1924)
 In High Gear (1924)
 Riders of Mystery (1925)
 Moccasins (1925)
 The Speed Demon (1925)
 The Battler (1925)
 Hidden Loot (1925)
 The Danger Zone (1925/I)
 The Border Sheriff (1926)
 Daniel Boone Thru the Wilderness (1926)
 Looking for Trouble (1926)
 The Fighting Doctor (1926)
 Davy Crockett at the Fall of the Alamo (1926)
 Sitting Bull at the Spirit Lake Massacre (1927)
 The Mojave Kid (1927)
 The Bantam Cowboy (1928)
 Lightning Speed (1928)
 Headin' for Danger (1928)
 Dugan of the Badlands (1931)
 A Son of the Plains (1931)
 Law of the West (1932)
 Riders of the Desert (1932)
 The Man from Hell's Edges (1932)
 Son of Oklahoma (1932)
 Hidden Valley (1932)
 Texas Buddies (1932)
 Breed of the Border (1933)
 The Gallant Fool (1933)
 Galloping Romeo (1933)
 Ranger's Code (1933)
 Riders of Destiny (1933) with John Wayne
 The Lucky Texan (1934) with John Wayne and George "Gabby" Hayes
 West of the Divide (1934) with John Wayne and George "Gabby" Hayes
 Blue Steel (1934) with John Wayne and George "Gabby" Hayes
 The Man from Utah (1934) with John Wayne and George "Gabby" Hayes
 The Star Packer (1934) with John Wayne and George "Gabby" Hayes
 Happy Landing (1934)
 The Trail Beyond (1934) with John Wayne, Noah Beery, Sr., and Noah Beery, Jr.
 The Lawless Frontier (1934) with John Wayne and George "Gabby" Hayes
 Western Justice (1934)
 Kid Courageous (1934)
 No Man's Range (1935)
 Texas Terror (1935) with John Wayne and George "Gabby" Hayes
 Big Calibre (1935)
 Rainbow Valley (1935) with John Wayne and George "Gabby" Hayes
 Smokey Smith (1935)
 Tombstone Terror (1935)
 The Dawn Rider (1935) with John Wayne
 Sundown Saunders (1935)
 Westward Ho (1935) with John Wayne
 The Rider of the Law (1935)
 Between Men (1935)
 Lawless Range (1935) with John Wayne
 Alias John Law (1935)
 The Courageous Avenger (1935)
 Trail of Terror (1935)
 Valley of the Lawless (1936)
 The Kid Ranger (1936)
 Last of the Warrens (1936)
 The Law Rides (1936)
 Brand of the Outlaws (1936)
 Cavalry (1936)
 Headin' for the Rio Grande (1936)
 The Gun Ranger (1937)
 Trouble in Texas (1937)
 Hittin' the Trail (1937)
 The Trusted Outlaw (1937)
 Sing, Cowboy, Sing (1937)
 Riders of the Rockies (1937)
 Riders of the Dawn (1937)
 God's Country and the Man (1937)
 Stars Over Arizona (1937)
 Where Trails Divide (1937)
 Danger Valley (1937)
 Romance of the Rockies (1937)
 Forbidden Trails (1941)
 The Gongoozler (1943)

Miscellaneous 
 Riders of Destiny (1933) (story)
 Blue Steel (1934) (story & screenplay)
 West of the Divide (1934) (story & screenplay)
 The Lucky Texan (1934) (story & screenplay)
 The Star Packer (1934) (story & screenplay)
 Blue Steel (1934) (producer) (uncredited)
 The Lawless Frontier (1934) (story & screenplay)
 Westward Ho (1935) (songwriter: "The Girl I Loved Long Ago") (uncredited)
 Texas Terror (1935) (story)
 The Dawn Rider (1935) (screenplay) (uncredited)
 Lawless Range (1935) (lyrics: "The Girl I Loved Long Ago" – uncredited) / (music: "The Girl I Loved Long Ago" – (uncredited)

External links 

 

1886 births
1949 deaths
American film directors
Burials at Forest Lawn Memorial Park (Glendale)
20th-century American screenwriters
People from Walla Walla, Washington